Hill Close Gardens is a group of 18 surviving Victorian detached gardens on a hillside in Warwick, Warwickshire, England. It is listed Grade II* in Historic England's Register of Parks and Gardens.

History
The gardens were set up in the 19th century on a hillside overlooking Warwick Racecourse to provide gardens for owners of townhouses which did not have their own gardens. They were generally owned staying in families for generations, although some were rented.  Each was enclosed by either a wall or hedge, complete with lockable gate to ensure privacy.

Many of them had summer houses built so the family could spend the entire day in the garden, whatever the weather.

They fell into disuse in the 20th century with only one or two remaining in use after WWII.

In the 1950s the local council (Warwick Municipal Borough) started buying up the plots with a plan to re-develop the hillside and in the 1960s it was designated for social housing.

Planning permission was granted in the 1980s and then subsequently lapsed although some building was completed.

In 1994, 4 of the summer houses were 'listed' as being of historical interest and in 2000 a Trust was formed to restore the gardens to their Victorian status.

The gardens opened to the public at Easter 2007 and have been operated by the Trust since.

Timeline 

 1500 onwards 	Enclosure of St Mary's Common, grazing rights retained for commoners, on aftermath, after Lammas (1 August)
 1707 Racing begins
 1725 Bread & Beef Close endowed for charity by Nicholas Rothwell
 1780 The Bowling Green probably developed/improved
 Late 1700s Pasture, probably owned by William Wilson, Warwickshire landowner
 1806 Land shows as undeveloped on Warwick Castle Estate map
 1820 – 1850 Other detached gardens existed in Warwick
 1841 Wilson Estate partitioned, owner becomes Swain Wilson of Coundon
 1845 Heir, Edward Wilson divides the land up into gardens
 1851 Map shows 23 plots, some with buildings, maybe wooden, or brick 
 1857 Bread & Beef Close divided into gardens
 1860 ca Stream culverted
 1866 Sold to Mark Philips of Welcombe - 32 plots for £1750, let for total of £77 (4.5%)
 1877 By now, all but 6 sold. Division of the freehold hinders subsequent building development.
 1886 Map shows summer houses on plots 5,16,17,19, 25 (22 is added later)
 1910 Building of street St Pauls Close & Terrace and Linen Street
 1948 Commons pass to Local Authority
 1950's Warwick Racecourse stables built
 1950's Warwick Municipal Borough start buying plots (while planning for an inner ring road)
 1960's Designated for social housing
 1985 Warwick District Council (WDC) first apply to build on Hill Close
 1989 Planning Permission for building lapsed – approx 19 plots then remaining
 1993 LADRA & Warwick Gardens Trust started objecting
 1994 Listing of 4 summerhouses, and later the gardens registered
 1998 Clearance work begun on site by volunteers
 2000 Hill Close Gardens Trust set up, leasing land from WDC for a peppercorn rent
 2005 HLF Grant obtained, restoration starts
 2007 Gardens opened to the public at Easter

Other listed garden allotments
 Bagthorpe Gardens, Nottingham
 St Ann's Allotments, Nottingham
 Stoney Road Allotments, Coventry
 Westbourne Road Town Gardens, Birmingham

References

External links
 Hill Close Gardens Trust

Gardens in Warwickshire
Warwick
Grade II* listed parks and gardens